In the late 1960s, Latin jazz, combining rhythms from African and Latin American countries, often played on instruments such as conga, timbale, güiro, and claves, with jazz and classical harmonies played on typical jazz instruments (piano, double bass, etc.) broke through. There are two main varieties: Afro-Cuban jazz was played in the US right after the bebop period, while Brazilian jazz became more popular in the 1960s. Afro-Cuban jazz began as a movement in the mid-1950s as bebop musicians such as Dizzy Gillespie and Billy Taylor started Afro-Cuban bands influenced by such Cuban and Puerto Rican musicians as Xavier Cugat, Tito Puente, and Arturo Sandoval. Brazilian jazz such as bossa nova is derived from samba, with influences from jazz and other 20th-century classical and popular music styles. Bossa is generally moderately paced, with melodies sung in Portuguese or English. The style was pioneered by Brazilians João Gilberto and Antônio Carlos Jobim. The related term jazz-samba describes an adaptation of bossa nova compositions to the jazz idiom by American performers such as Stan Getz and Charlie Byrd.

Bossa nova was made popular by Elizete Cardoso's recording of Chega de Saudade on the Canção do Amor Demais LP, composed by Vinícius de Moraes (lyrics) and Antonio Carlos Jobim (music). The initial releases by Gilberto and the 1959 film Black Orpheus brought significant popularity in Brazil and elsewhere in Latin America, which spread to North America via visiting American jazz musicians. The resulting recordings by Charlie Byrd and Stan Getz cemented its popularity and led to a worldwide boom with 1963's Getz/Gilberto, numerous recordings by famous jazz performers such as Ella Fitzgerald (Ella Abraça Jobim) and Frank Sinatra (Francis Albert Sinatra & Antônio Carlos Jobim), and the entrenchment of the bossa nova style as a lasting influence in world music for several decades and even up to the present.

1960s jazz standards

1960–1964

 1961 – "Impressions". Composed by John Coltrane.
 1963 – "Once I Loved" (a.k.a. "Amor em Paz", also "Love in Peace"). Composed by Antonio Carlos Jobim with lyrics by Vinicius de Moraes (Portuguese) and Ray Gilbert (English).
 1961 – "One Note Samba" (a.k.a. "Samba de Uma Nota Só"). Composed by Antonio Carlos Jobim with lyrics by Newton Mendonça (Portuguese) and Antonio Carlos Jobim (English).
 1961 – "Stolen Moments". Composed by Oliver Nelson.
 1962 – "Corcovado" (a.k.a. "Quiet Nights of Quiet Stars"). Composed by Antonio Carlos Jobim with lyrics by Antonio Carlos Jobim (Portuguese) and Gene Lees (English).
 1962 – "Days of Wine and Roses". Composed by Henry Mancini with lyrics by Johnny Mercer.
 1962 – "Meditation" (a.k.a. "Meditação"). Composed by Antonio Carlos Jobim Newton Mendonça (Portuguese) Norman Gimbel (English).
 1962 – "Up Jumped Spring". Composed by Freddie Hubbard.
 1963 – "Blue Bossa". Composed by Kenny Dorham.
 1963 – "Bluesette". Composed by Jean Thielemans with lyrics by Norman Gimbel.
 1963 – "Four". Composed by Miles Davis.
 1963 – "The Girl from Ipanema" (a.k.a. "Garôta de Ipanema"). Composed by Antonio Carlos Jobim with lyrics by Vinicius de Moraes (Portuguese) and Norman Gimbel (English).
 1963 – "How Insensitive" (a.k.a. "Insensatez"). Composed by Antonio Carlos Jobim with lyrics by Vinicius de Moraes (Portuguese) and Norman Gimbel (English).
 1963 – "If You Never Come to Me" (a.k.a. "Inútil Paisagem"). Composed by Antonio Carlos Jobim with lyrics by Aloysio de Oliveira (Portuguese) and Ray Gilbert (English).
 1963 – "Oye Como Va". Written by Tito Puente.
 1963 – "Recorda-Me". Composed by Joe Henderson.
 1963 – "The Sidewinder". Composed by Lee Morgan.
 1963 – "Só Danço Samba" (a.k.a. "Jazz 'N' Samba"). Composed by Antonio Carlos Jobim with lyrics by Vinicius de Moraes (Portuguese) and Norman Gimbel (English).
 1963 – "St. Thomas". Composed by Sonny Rollins.
 1963 – "Water to Drink" (a.k.a. "Água de Beber"). Composed by Antonio Carlos Jobim with lyrics by Vinicius de Moraes (Portuguese) and Norman Gimbel (English).
 1963 – "Watermelon Man". Composed by Herbie Hancock.
 1964 – "Cantaloupe Island". Composed by Herbie Hancock.
 1964 – "Inner Urge". Composed by Joe Henderson.
 1964 – "JuJu". Composed by Wayne Shorter.
 1964 – "Mahjong". Composed by Wayne Shorter.
 1964 – "Song for My Father". Composed by Horace Silver.
 1964 – "Linus and Lucy, Composed by Vince Guaraldi.

1965–1969

 1965 – "Ceora". Written by Lee Morgan.
 1965 – "Dindi". Composed by Antonio Carlos Jobim with lyrics by Aloysio de Oliveira (Portuguese) Ray Gilbert (English).
 1965 – "Dolphin Dance". Composed by Herbie Hancock.
 1965 – "E.S.P.". Composed by Wayne Shorter.
 1965 – "The Gentle Rain" (a.k.a. "Chuva Delicada"). Written by Luiz Bonfá with English lyrics by  Matt Dubey.
 1965 – "The Gift!" (a.k.a. "Recado Bossa Nova"). Composed by Djalma Ferreira, with lyrics by Luiz Antônio (Portuguese) Paul Francis Webster (English).
 1965 – "Maiden Voyage". Modal jazz composition by Herbie Hancock from his album Maiden Voyage. It was used in a Fabergé commercial and originally called "TV Jingle".
 1965 – "Speak No Evil". Wayne Shorter.
 1966 – "Footprints". Composed by Wayne Shorter.
 1966 – "Mercy, Mercy, Mercy". Composed by Joe Zawinul with lyrics by Johnny "Guitar" Watson and Larry Williams.
 1966 – "Summer Samba" (a.k.a. "Samba de Verão", also "So Nice") Composed by Marcos Valle with lyrics by Paulo Sérgio Valle (Portuguese) Norman Gimbel (English).
 1967 – "Freedom Jazz Dance". Composed by Eddie Harris.
 1967 – "Triste". Written by Antonio Carlos Jobim.
 1967 – "Wave" (a.k.a. "Vou Te Contar"). Written by Antonio Carlos Jobim.

1960

Events
The Cannonball Adderley Quintet records At the Lighthouse at the Lighthouse Café in Hermosa Beach, California.

Album releases

John Coltrane: Giant Steps
Ornette Coleman: Free Jazz 
Max Roach: Freedom Now Suite
Charles Mingus: Presents
Gunther Schuller [John Lewis]: Jazz Abstractions 
George Russell: Jazz in the Space Age 
Eric Dolphy: Far Cry
Joe Harriott: Free Form 
Tina Brooks: True Blue
Randy Weston: Uhuru Afrika 
Cecil Taylor: The World of Cecil Taylor 
Gil Evans: Out of the Cool 
Lennie Tristano: The New Tristano 
Clark Terry: Color Changes 
Jimmy Giuffre: Piece for Clarinet and String Orchestra/Mobiles 
Hank Mobley: Soul Station 
Horace Silver: Horace-Scope
Art Blakey: The Big Beat
Art Blakey: A Night in Tunisia
Modern Jazz Quartet: Pyramid 
Modern Jazz Quartet: European Concert 
Betty Carter: The Modern Sound of Betty Carter
Oliver Nelson: Takin' Care of Business 
Wes Montgomery: The Incredible Jazz Guitar
Sam Jones: The Soul Society 
George Russell: Stratusphunk 
David Newman and James Clay: The Sound of the Wide Open Spaces!!!!
Duke Jordan: Flight to Jordan 
Herbie Mann: Flute, Brass, Vibes and Percussion
the Jazztet: Meet the Jazztet 
Phil Woods: Rights of Swing
Art Pepper: Gettin' Together
Jimmy Smith: Back at the Chicken Shack 
Don Ellis: How Time Passes

Births
Branford Marsalis (August 26, 1960–), saxophonist

Deaths
Beverly Kenney (January 29, 1932 – April 13, 1960), singer
Oscar Pettiford (September 30, 1922 – September 8, 1960)

Awards
Grammy Awards of 1960 
Best Jazz Performance Solo or Small Group
Jonah Jones for I Dig Chicks

1961

Album releases

Basie at Birdland - Count Basie Orchestra (Roulette)
Buhaina's Delight - Art Blakey  (Blue Note)
A Jazz Hour with Art Blakey's Jazz Messengers: Blues March - Art Blakey (Movieplay)
Mosaic - Art Blakey (Blue Note)
Pisces - Art Blakey (Blue Note)
Time Further Out - The Dave Brubeck Quartet (Columbia)
Free Jazz: A Collective Improvisation - Ornette Coleman (Atlantic)
Coltrane Jazz - John Coltrane (Atlantic)
My Favorite Things - John Coltrane (Atlantic)
Live in Stockholm 1961 - John Coltrane (LeJazz)
American Freedom - Duke Ellington and Louis Armstrong (Blue Note)
Out of the Cool - Gil Evans Orchestra (Impulse!)
Focus - Stan Getz (Verve)
The Futuristic Sounds of Sun Ra (aka, We are in the future) - Sun Ra and his Arkestra (Savoy Records)
We Travel the Spaceways - Sun Ra and his Myth Science Arkestra
Secrets of the Sun - by Sun Ra and his Solar Arkestra (El Saturn Records)
Cosmic Tones for Mental Therapy - Sun Ra and his Myth Science Arkestra
Bad and Beautiful - Sun Ra and his Myth Science Arkestra (El Saturn Records, Impulse!)
Fate in a Pleasant Mood - Sun Ra and his Myth Science Arkestra (El Saturn Records, Impulse!)
Percussion Bitter Sweet - Max Roach (Impulse!)
Forbidden Fruit - Nina Simone (Colpix)
New Ideas - Don Ellis (New Jazz - Prestige Records)
On the Spur of the Moment - Horace Parlan (Blue Note)

1962

Events
Several recordings are made at the Lighthouse Café in Hermosa Beach, California: Curtis Amy, Tippin' on Through; The Jazz Crusaders, The Jazz Crusaders at the Lighthouse.

Album releases

Charles Mingus: Epitaph
Cecil Taylor: Nefertiti 
Jimmy Giuffre: Free Fall 
Joe Harriott: Abstract 
Jackie McLean: Let Freedom Ring 
Sonny Rollins: The Bridge 
Dexter Gordon: Go 
Freddie Hubbard: The Artistry of Freddie Hubbard
Jimmy Woods: Awakening!!
George Russell: The Stratus Seekers 
Oscar Peterson: Night Train 
Prince Lasha: The Cry!
Sheila Jordan: Portrait of Sheila 
Don Ellis: Essence
Modern Jazz Quartet: The Comedy

Deaths
Doug Watkins (March 2, 1934 – February 5, 1962)

1963

Album releases

Charles Mingus: The Black Saint and the Sinner Lady
Sun Ra: Cosmic Tones For Mental Therapy 
Joe Harriott: Movement 
Andrew Hill: Black Fire 
Bill Evans: Conversations with Myself
Thelonious Monk: Criss Cross 
Jackie McLean: Destination... Out! 
Stanley Turrentine: Soul Shoutin' 
Eric Dolphy: Iron Man
Jackie McLean: One Step Beyond 
Joe Henderson: Page One 
Kai Winding: Solo 
Art Blakey: Ugetsu 
Lee Morgan: The Sidewinder
Donald Byrd: A New Perspective
Chico Hamilton: Man from Two Worlds 
Grant Green: Idle Moments
Kenny Burrell: Midnight Blue

Deaths
Dinah Washington (August 29, 1924 – December 14, 1963) 
Sonny Clark (July 21, 1931 – January 13, 1963)
Ike Quebec (August 17, 1918 - January 16, 1963)
Herbie Nichols (January 3, 1919 – April 12, 1963)

1964

Album releases

John Coltrane: A Love Supreme
Albert Ayler: Spiritual Unity
Eric Dolphy: Out to Lunch! 
Albert Ayler: New York Eye And Ear Control 
Albert Ayler: Witches and Devils 
Andrew Hill: Point of Departure 
Sam Rivers: Fuchsia Swing Song
Wayne Shorter: Speak No Evil
Herbie Hancock: Empyrean Isles 
New York Art Quartet: New York Art Quartet
Albert Ayler: Vibrations 
Sun Ra: Other Planes of There 
Horace Silver: Song For My Father 
André Previn: My Fair Lady
Denny Zeitlin: Carnival 
Kenny Burrell: Guitar Forms 
Ben Webster: See You at the Fair 
Oscar Peterson: Canadiana Suite
Cal Tjader: Soul Sauce 
Denny Zeitlin: Cathexis 
Randy Weston: African Cookbook 
Duke Pearson: Wahoo 
Freddie Hubbard: Breaking Point 
Joe Henderson: In 'n Out 
Tony Scott: Music for Zen Meditation 
Joe Henderson: Inner Urge 
Larry Young: Into Somethin'
Lee Morgan: Search For The New Land 
John Coltrane: Crescent 
Oscar Peterson: Trio Plus One 
Shirley Scott: Blue Flames 
Wayne Shorter: JuJu 
Tony Williams: Life Time 
Guenter Hampel: Heartplants

Deaths
Eric Dolphy (June 20, 1928 – June 29, 1964), American alto saxophonist, flautist, and bass clarinetist
Jack Teagarden (August 20, 1905 – January 15, 1964)
Cecil Scott (November 22, 1905 – January 5, 1964)

1965

Album releases

John Coltrane: Ascension
Sun Ra: The Magic City
Marion Brown: Marion Brown Quartet
Don Cherry: Complete Communion 
Sam Rivers: Contours 
Herbie Hancock: Maiden Voyage
Roland Kirk: Rip, Rig and Panic 
Sun Ra: The Heliocentric Worlds of Sun Ra, Volume Two
John Coltrane: Meditations 
Milford Graves: Percussion Ensemble 
Patty Waters: Sings 
Wayne Shorter: The All Seeing Eye 
Andrew Hill: Compulsion
Ornette Coleman: Chappaqua Suite
Wayne Shorter: Soothsayer 
Bobby Hutcherson: Components 
New York Art Quartet: Mohawk 
Horace Silver: The Cape Verdean Blues 
Bobby Hutcherson: Dialogue
Ben Webster: Stormy Weather 
Lee Morgan: Cornbread 
Prince Lasha: Inside Story 
Lee Morgan: The Gigolo 
Archie Shepp: Fire Music
Roswell Rudd: Roswell Rudd
Eddie Palmieri: Mozambique
Gabor Szabo: Gypsy
Vince Guaraldi: A Charlie Brown Christmas soundtrack

Deaths
 Nat King Cole (March 17, 1919 – February 15, 1965)
 Tadd Dameron (February 21, 1917 – March 8, 1965)
 Claude Thornhill (August 10, 1908 – July 1, 1965)
 Earl Bostic (April 25, 1913 – October 28, 1965)

Births
 Sylvain Luc (April 7), French guitarist

1966

Events
The Jazz Crusaders record Live at the Lighthouse '66 at the Lighthouse Café in Hermosa Beach, California

Album releases

Cecil Taylor: Unit Structures
Roscoe Mitchell: Sound 
Don Cherry: Symphony For Improvisers
Cecil Taylor: Conquistador!
Alexander von Schlippenbach: Globe Unity 
Archie Shepp: Mama Too Tight
Steve Lacy: The Forest And The Zoo 
Joe Harriott: Indo-Jazz Suite 
Steve Lacy: Sortie 
Duke Ellington: The Far East Suite 
Chick Corea: Tones For Joan's Bones
Sun Ra: Strange Strings 
Patty Waters: College Tour 
Joseph Jarman: Song For 
Guenter Hampel: Assemblage 
Joe Harriott: Indo-Jazz Fusions 
Bobby Hutcherson: Happenings 
Wayne Shorter: Adam's Apple 
Bobby Hutcherson: Stick-Up! 
Charles Lloyd: Dream Weaver 
Charles Tyler: First Album
Denny Zeitlin: Zeitgeist 
Jaki Byard: Sunshine of My Soul 
Horace Silver: The Jody Grind 
Larry Young: Of Love And Peace 
Lee Morgan: Delightfulee 
Sonny Simmons: Music from the Spheres 
Dewey Redman: Look for the Black Star 
Sunny Murray: Sunny Murray Quintet
Frank Wright: Frank Wright Trio

Deaths
Bud Powell (September 27, 1924 – July 31, 1966)
Dave Lambert (June 19, 1917 - October 3, 1966)
Billy Kyle (July 14, 1914 - February 23, 1966)

1967

Album releases

Sun Ra: Atlantis
Gary Burton: A Genuine Tong Funeral
Sam Rivers: Dimensions and Extensions
Roscoe Mitchell: Old Quartet 
Bill Dixon: Intents and Purposes 
George Russell: Othello Ballet Suite 
Muhal Richard Abrams: Levels and Degrees of Light 
Archie Shepp: The Magic of Ju-Ju 
Don Ellis: Turkish Bath
Jackie McLean: New and Old Gospel 
Roland Kirk: The Inflated Tear
Frank Wright: Your Prayer
Spontaneous Music Ensemble: Withdrawal
Peter Brötzmann: For Adolphe Sax 
Miles Davis: Nefertiti
Jackie McLean: Demon's Dance 
Miles Davis: Sorcerer
Gary Burton: Duster
John Coltrane: Expression
McCoy Tyner: The Real McCoy 
Wayne Shorter: Schizophrenia 
Lee Konitz: Duets 
Paul Bley: Virtuosi 
Lester Bowie: Numbers 1 & 2 
Paul Bley: Ballads

Births
Sascha Ley (September 13-), Luxembourgian singer

Deaths

Billy Strayhorn (November 29, 1915 – May 31, 1967), composer and pianist
John Coltrane (September 23, 1926 – July 17, 1967), American saxophonist and composer
Paul Whiteman (March 28, 1890 – December 29, 1967)
Stuff Smith (August 14, 1909 - September 25, 1967)
Rex Stewart (February 22, 1907 – September 7, 1967)
Red Allen (January 7, 1906 – April 17, 1967)
Edmond Hall (May 15, 1901 – February 11, 1967)
Willie Smith (November 25, 1910 – March 7, 1967)

1968

Album releases

Chick Corea: Now He Sings, Now He Sobs 
Roscoe Mitchell: Congliptious 
Don Cherry: Eternal Rhythm 
Miles Davis: Filles de Kilimanjaro 
Peter Brötzmann: Machine Gun
John Surman: John Surman
Spontaneous Music Ensemble: Karyobin 
Kenny Wheeler: Windmill Tilter 
Modern Jazz Quartet: Under the Jasmin Tree
Roland Kirk: Left & Right
Sun Ra: Outer Spaceways Incorporated 
Horace Silver: Serenade to a Soul Sister 
Paul Horn: Inside the Taj Mahal
McCoy Tyner: Expansions
Gary Bartz: Another Earth 
Pat Martino: Baiyina 
Charles Tolliver: Paper Man
Herbie Hancock: Speak Like a Child
Miles Davis: Miles in the Sky 
John Coltrane: om

Births
Kyle Eastwood -bassist (May 19, 1968-)

Deaths
Wes Montgomery (March 6, 1923 - June 15, 1968)
Luckey Roberts (August 7, 1887 – February 5, 1968)

1969

Events
Trumpeter Miles Davis uses a wah-wah pedal on Bitches Brew.

Album releases

Don Cherry: Mu
Miles Davis: Bitches Brew
Pharoah Sanders: Karma
Miles Davis: In a Silent Way
Art Ensemble of Chicago: People in Sorrow 
George Russell: Electronic Sonata For Souls Loved By Nature
Art Ensemble of Chicago: Reese and the Smooth Ones 
Kalaparusha Maurice McIntyre: Humility in the Light of Creator
Charlie Haden: Liberation Music Orchestra
Dollar Brand: African Piano 
Guenter Hampel: The 8th of July 1969
Roland Kirk: Rahsaan Rahsaan 
Pharoah Sanders: Jewels of Thought 
Archie Shepp: Yasmina, a Black Woman
Art Ensemble of Chicago: A Jackson In Your House
Charles Tolliver: The Ringer
Joe McPhee: Underground Railroad
Jan Garbarek: Esoteric Circle 
Pharoah Sanders: Izipho Zam 
Sunny Murray: Homage to Africa
Chick Corea: Is
Dewey Redman: Tarik
Willem Breuker: Lunchconcert For Three Barrel-organs 
Joe Harriott: Hum-Dono 
Peter Brötzmann: Nipples
Charles Earland: Black Talk
Wolfgang Dauner: Fuer 
Eric Kloss: To Hear Is To See 
Leon Thomas: Spirits Known and Unknown 
Miroslav Vitous: Mountain in the Clouds 
Tony Williams: Emergency
Archie Shepp: Blasé
Dollar Brand: African Sketchbook
John McLaughlin: Extrapolation
Stanley Cowell: Blues for the Viet Cong
Stanley Cowell: Brilliant Circles 
Wolfgang Dauner: The Oimels 
Horace Tapscott: West Coast Hot
Liberation Music Orchestra: Song for Che

Births
Joshua Redman (February 1, 1969-), saxophonist

Deaths
Paul Chambers (April 22, 1935 – January 4, 1969)
Coleman Hawkins (November 21, 1904 – May 19, 1969)
Pee Wee Russell (March 27, 1906 – February 15, 1969)

References

Bibliography

1960s in music
20th century in jazz
Jazz by decade
1960s decade overviews